In the 2011–12 season, JS Kabylie competed in the Ligue 1 for the 41st season, as well as the Algerian Cup.

Squad list
Players and squad numbers last updated on 18 November 2011.Note: Flags indicate national team as has been defined under FIFA eligibility rules. Players may hold more than one non-FIFA nationality.

Competitions

Overview

{| class="wikitable" style="text-align: center"
|-
!rowspan=2|Competition
!colspan=8|Record
!rowspan=2|Started round
!rowspan=2|Final position / round
!rowspan=2|First match	
!rowspan=2|Last match
|-
!
!
!
!
!
!
!
!
|-
| Ligue 1

|  
| 9th
| 15 September 2011
| 21 May 2012
|-
| Algerian Cup

| Round of 64 
| Round of 16
| 30 December 2011
| 10 March 2012
|-
| Confederation Cup

| colspan=2| Group stage 
| 16 July 2011
| 17 September 2011
|-
! Total

Ligue 1

League table

Results summary

Results by round

Matches

Algerian Cup

Confederation Cup

Group stage

Group B

Squad information

Playing statistics

|-

|-
! colspan=12 style=background:#dcdcdc; text-align:center| Players transferred out during the season

Goalscorers
Includes all competitive matches. The list is sorted alphabetically by surname when total goals are equal.

Transfers

In

Out

References

JS Kabylie seasons
Algerian football clubs 2011–12 season